Eric Walsky (born September 30, 1984) is a Swiss-American former professional ice hockey right winger. He played most of his career in the National League (NL) with Genève-Servette HC, HC Lugano, Lausanne HC and on loan with the SC Rapperswil-Jona Lakers.

Playing career
Undrafted, Walsky played with the River City Lancers of the USHL before committing to a four-year collegiate career split between the University of Alaska-Anchorage and Colorado College. Upon completing his senior year with the Tigers, Walsky signed a contract with the Vancouver Canucks of the National Hockey League on March 20, 2009. He then joined the Canucks American Hockey League affiliate, the Manitoba Moose, on an amateur try-out to conclude the 2008–09 season.

In the 2009–10 season, Eric was assigned to Moose to begin his first professional season. He played only 37 games with Manitoba before he was reassigned to secondary affiliate the Victoria Salmon Kings of the ECHL. He then signed a three-year contract with Genève-Servette HC of the Swiss NLA on June 7, 2010. In January 2013, he signed, with fellow Geneva teammate Dan Fritsche, a three-year contract with the HC Lugano through the end of the 2016 season.

Walsky was forced to retire from professional hockey prior to the 2017-18 season because of multiple concussion issues.

Career statistics

References

External links

1984 births
Alaska Anchorage Seawolves men's ice hockey players
American men's ice hockey right wingers
Colorado College Tigers men's ice hockey players
Genève-Servette HC players
Ice hockey people from Anchorage, Alaska
Living people
Manitoba Moose players
Victoria Salmon Kings players